Elvira de Mendoza (d. 1523), was a Spanish and Portuguese court official. 

She was the daughter of the nobleman Juan Furtado de Mendoza, chief forester of Ferdinand and Isabella, and married Martin de Alarcon, captain of the guard to the king and queen of Castile.  As a widow, she accompanied Maria of Aragon, Queen of Portugal on her marriage to the king of Portugal in 1500 as her lady-in-waiting. She became a trusted favorite and confidante of the queen and awarded a pension of 200.000 reis in 1508. After the queen's death, she was appointed aia (nurse) to the princesses, Isabella of Portugal and Beatrice of Portugal, Duchess of Savoy. Upon the arrival of the new queen, Eleanor of Austria, she was appointed her lady-in-waiting, and became her trusted companion. She had an influential position at court, and had her son Joao de Alarcao appointed royal grand master of the hunt in 1521. She accompanied the widowed Eleonor back to Castile in 1523, and died shortly after.

References

 Joan-Lluís Palos & Magdalena S. Sánchez:Early Modern Dynastic Marriages and Cultural Transfer

1523 deaths
16th-century Portuguese people
Portuguese ladies-in-waiting
Royal governesses